Giời Markets, or Trời (Sun) Markets, is the name of the site of the Hoa Binh Fair, Hanoi, Việt Nam. This is where a full range of trade goods are sold, from the smallest such as nails and batteries to large items such as motors, electronic goods and refrigeration equipment.

History
According to some sources, the Giời market was established around 1954 or 1955. At that time many people were evacuating to the south of Việt Nam and needed to sell the family goods that they could not take with them. As a number of people had lived here for a long time, it was called "Giời Markets" from the period 1975–1986. When you wanted to buy goods you needed to order them. Traders from state-owned stores also took part, some goods were stolen and displayed on the pavement, a market place without roofs, i.e. Giời market.

Location
The Giời Market still occupies the same location as the original market did. This included Thinh Yen Street and part of Đồng Nhân Street, Tran Cao Van Street, Temple and King Alleys. Goods are auctioned and buyers can watch and wait before bidding for any item.

More information
It used to be said that in Hanoi, if something was stolen from you (such as the spare parts of motorcycles and cars, all electric goods, appliances, etc.), you could go to the market to repurchase the item that you had just lost. There was a time, in Giời market, when people could also purchase the plate numbers of automobiles and motorcycles, but the police promptly put a stop to this.

Buildings and structures in Hanoi
Retail markets in Vietnam